GrafTech International Ltd. is a manufacturer of graphite electrodes and petroleum coke, which are essential for the production of electric arc furnace steel and other metals. The company is headquartered in Brooklyn Heights, Ohio and has manufacturing facilities in Calais, France, Pamplona, Spain, Monterrey, Mexico, and St. Marys, Pennsylvania.

History
The company was founded in 1886 as the National Carbon Company, which was then acquired by Union Carbide in 1917 and became its Carbon Products Division.

In 1914, the company introduced the first 12-inch diameter graphite electrodes.

In 1956, the company received an Academy Award for the development and production of a high-efficiency yellow flame carbon for motion picture color photography.

Between 1956–1978, the company developed high performance carbon fibers; this was recognized in 2003 with a National Historic Chemical Landmark from the American Chemical Society.

In 1985, the company developed advanced technology for carbon/carbon composite material used in spacecraft.

Union Carbide was reorganized in 1989, with the Carbon Products Division renamed as the UCAR Carbon Company.

In 1990, the company introduced first 30-inch diameter graphite electrodes for UHP DC arc furnaces.

In 1995, the company developed new graphite for the US Advanced Battery Consortium for a lithium-ion battery in electric vehicles.

In 1995, the company became a public company via an initial public offering.

In 1999, the company developed first natural graphite-based heat spreaders for electronic thermal management.

In 2002, the company changed its name from UCAR to Graftech.

In 2004, the company introduced optimized pinless joint design for large-diameter graphite electrodes.

In 2007, the company commercialized high-temperature insulation solutions for the polysilicon and solar energy industries.

In 2010, the company launched high thermal conductivity SPREADERSHIELD™ products for electronics and lighting applications.

In 2010, GrafTech acquired two companies: Seadrift Coke LP, a manufacturer of petroleum coke, which is an essential component in the production of graphite electrodes; and C/G Electrodes LLC, which manufactures graphite electrodes.

In March 2011, the company acquired Micron Research Corporation, a manufacturer of superfine-grained graphite.

In October 2011, the company acquired advanced carbon composite manufacturer Fiber Materials. Fiber Materials was sold in 2016.

In 2011, the company was awarded two historical markers by the Ohio Historical Society. One is for pioneering battery research made at Parma by Lewis Urry and National Carbon Company. The other recognizes the Lakewood facility’s long history and National Carbon Company.

In August 2015, GrafTech was acquired by Brookfield Asset Management.

In 2017, the company sold its NeoGraf and Advanced Graphite Materials divisions to focus on graphite electrodes and petroleum coke.

In April 2018, the company once again became a public company via an initial public offering.

Controversies
On April 1, 1998, the company was subject to a class action lawsuit for allegedly artificially inflating stock price. In 2000, the company settled the lawsuit for $40.5 million.

In April 1998, the company was fined $110 million by the United States Department of Justice and in July 2001, the company was fined €50.4 million by the European Commission for participating in an international price fixing cartel with 7 other firms in the market for graphite electrodes.

References

External links
GrafTech International official website
Brookfield Asset Management official website

Companies listed on the New York Stock Exchange
Companies based in Ohio
Manufacturing companies established in 1886
Parma, Ohio
1886 establishments in Ohio